The Browns Bank Corals Marine Protected Area is an offshore conservation region in the exclusive economic zone of South Africa.

History

Purpose

A marine protected area is defined by the IUCN as "A clearly defined geographical space, recognised, dedicated and managed, through legal or other effective means, to achieve the long-term conservation of nature with associated ecosystem services and cultural values".

The Browns Bank Corals MPA is specifically intended to protect cold water corals and their ecosystems and the biodiversity and ecological processes associated with these ecosystems. It is a known spawning ground for the commercially important hake fishery.

Extent
An offshore Marine Protected Area on the western edge of the Agulhas Bank about 70 nautical miles south of Cape Agulhas in the 250 m to 400 m depth range. The MPA includes the water column, sea bed, and subsoil within the boundaries. Total sea area protected is about 300 km2

Boundaries
The MPA comprises three separate areas

Browns Bank Corals 1 (North):
Northern boundary: S35°33’, E19°11’ to S35°38.460’, E19°20’
Eastern boundary: S35°38.460’, E19°20’ to S35°42.780’, E19°20’
Southern boundary: S35°42.780’, E19°20’ to S35°38’, E19°11’
Western boundary: S35°38’, E19°11’ to S35°33’, E19°11’

Browns Bank Corals 2 (Central):
Eastern boundary: S35°58’, E19°35’ to  S35°58’, E19°41’
Southern boundary: S35°58’, E19°41’ to S36°8’, E19°53’
Western boundary: S36°8’, E19°53’ to S36°8’, E19°46.50’
Northern boundary: S36°8’, E19°46.50’ to S35°58’, E19°35’

Browns Bank Corals 3 (South): 
Northern boundary: S36°22’, E20°0’ to S36° 22’, E20°2’
North-eastern boundary: S36°22’, E20°2’ to S36°32’, E20°13’
Southern boundary: S36°32’, E20°13’ to S36°32’, E20°10’
South-western boundary: S36°32’, E20°10’ to S36°24’, E20°0’
Western boundary: S36°24’, E20°0’ to S36°22’, E20°0’

Zonation

The entire MPA is a controlled area.

Management
The marine protected areas of South Africa are the responsibility of the national government, which has management  agreements with a variety of MPA management authorities, which manage the MPAs with funding from the SA Government through the Department of Environmental Affairs (DEA).

The Department of Agriculture, Forestry and Fisheries is responsible for issuing permits, quotas and law enforcement.

Benefits
Cold water corals provide habitat for Hake and other fish to reproduce and for their young to be protected during growth. When studied, cold water corals provide climate information from many years ago, which can be compared to recent data to provide insight about our current climate. Studying this area may also uncover species as yet undocumented by science. Adhering to Hake fishery eco-certification standards safeguards the coral and habitat it provides as well as promoting the well-being of local communities that depend on fishing for jobs and food.

Geography

Climate of the South-western Cape

Seasonal variations in sea conditions

Ecology

The MPA is in the cool temperate Atlantic offshore bioregion to the west of the continental shelf.

Three major habitats exist in the sea in this region, two of them distinguished by the nature of the substrate. The substrate, or base material, is important in that it provides a base to which an organism can anchor itself, which is vitally important for those organisms which need to stay in one particular kind of place. Rocky shores and reefs provide a firm fixed substrate for the attachment of plants and animals. Some of these may have Kelp forests, which reduce the effect of waves and provide food and shelter for an extended range of organisms. Sedimentary bottoms are a relatively unstable substrate and cannot anchor many of the benthic organisms. Finally there is open water, above the substrate and clear of the kelp forest, where the organisms must drift or swim. Mixed habitats are also frequently found, which are a combination of those mentioned above.

Rocky reefs
There are rocky reefs and mixed rocky and sandy bottoms. For many marine organisms the substrate is another type of marine organism, and it is common for several layers to co-exist.

The type of rock of the reef is of some importance, as it influences the range of possibilities for the local topography, which in turn influences the range of habitats provided, and therefore the diversity of inhabitants. Sandstone and other sedimentary rocks erode and weather very differently, and depending on the direction of dip and strike, and steepness of the dip, may produce reefs which are relatively flat to very high profile and full of small crevices. These features may be at varying angles to the shoreline and wave fronts. There are fewer large holes, tunnels and crevices in sandstone reefs, but often many deep but low near-horizontal crevices.

Sedimentary bottoms (including silt, mud, sand, shelly, pebble and gravel bottoms)
Sedimentary bottoms at first glance appear to be fairly barren areas, as they lack the stability to support many of the spectacular reef based species, and the variety of large organisms is relatively low. The sediment may be moved around by currents, to a greater or lesser degree depending on weather conditions and exposure of the area. This means that sessile organisms must be specifically adapted to areas of relatively loose substrate to thrive in them, and the variety of species found on an unconsolidated sedimentary bottom will depend on all these factors. Sedimentary bottoms have one important compensation for their instability, animals can burrow into the sand and move up and down within its layers, which can provide feeding opportunities and protection from predation. Other species can dig themselves holes in which to shelter, or may feed by filtering water drawn through the tunnel, or by extending body parts adapted to this function into the water above the sand.

The open sea
The pelagic water column is the major part of the living space at sea. This is the water between the surface and the top of the benthic zone, where living organisms swim, float or drift, and the food chain starts with phytoplankton, the mostly microscopic photosynthetic organisms that convert the energy of sunlight into organic material which feeds nearly everything else, directly or indirectly. In temperate seas there are distinct seasonal cycles of phytoplankton growth, based on the available nutrients and the available sunlight. Either can be a limiting factor. Phytoplankton tend to thrive where there is plenty of light, and they themselves are a major factor in restricting light penetration to greater depths, so the photosynthetic zone tends to be shallower in areas of high productivity. Zooplankton feed on the phytoplankton, and are in turn eaten by larger animals. The larger pelagic animals are generally faster moving and more mobile, giving them the option of changing depth to feed or to avoid predation, and to move to other places in search of a better food supply.

Marine species diversity

Animals

Seaweeds

Endemism

Alien invasive species

Threats

See also

References

Marine protected areas of South Africa
Marine biodiversity of South Africa